The 2007–08 Providence Friars men's basketball team represented Providence College in the 2007–08 NCAA Division I men's basketball season. The Friars, led by tenth-year head coach Tim Welsh, played their home games at the Dunkin' Donuts Center as members of the Big East Conference. They finished the season 15–16 with a 6–12 record in the Big East, before losing in the first round of the Big East tournament to West Virginia.

Previous season
The Friars finished the 2006–07 season with an 18–13 record with an 8–8 record in Big East play. They were the 10th seed in the 2007 Big East tournament and lost to the West Virginia Mountaineers in the first round. The team earned an at-large bid to the 2007 NIT as a 5-seed and lost in the first round.

Roster

Schedule and results 

|-
!colspan=9 style=| Exhibition

|-
!colspan=9 style=| Non-conference regular season

|-
!colspan=10| Big East tournament

References

Providence
Providence Friars men's basketball seasons
Providence
Providence